Urhobo may refer to:
Urhobo people
Urhobo language

Language and nationality disambiguation pages